Francis Jay Herron (February 17, 1837 – January 8, 1902) was an American soldier who was a Union general during the American Civil War.

Biography
Francis J. Herron attended the Western University of Pennsylvania, but left at the age of sixteen without completing his degree to become a bank clerk. In 1855, he joined his three brothers in Dubuque, Iowa, where they established a bank. In 1859, he organized and was elected captain of a militia company known as the "Governor's Greys," which Herron offered to President-elect Abraham Lincoln in January 1861, two months prior to Lincoln's inauguration.

In April 1861, Herron was appointed captain of Company I, 1st Iowa Volunteer Regiment. He served with Nathaniel Lyon's forces in Missouri, participating in the battles of Boonville and Wilson's Creek. In August, Herron was promoted to lieutenant colonel of the 9th Iowa Volunteer Regiment and fought in the battle of Pea Ridge, where he was wounded and taken prisoner, but exchanged shortly afterwards. He received a promotion to brigadier general of volunteers for his actions in this battle, and later received the Medal of Honor. Herron's and Blunt's combined command engaged Thomas C. Hindman in the battle of Prairie Grove and forced the Confederates to abandon western Arkansas. For his actions at Prairie Grove, Herron was appointed major general of volunteers, becoming the youngest major general on either side at the time of his promotion.

His two divisions were consolidated to form "Herron's Division" which was attached to the XVII Corps. During the Siege of Vicksburg, Herron's division was placed on the extreme left flank of the Union lines. Upon the surrender of the city Ulysses S. Grant chose Herron, along with generals James B. McPherson and John A. Logan, to lead the procession into the city and accept the formal surrender of arms on July 4, 1863. He next led the Yazoo City expedition, capturing the city, a Confederate fleet and supplies there. Herron was appointed to command of the XIII Corps and occupied the Texas coast with headquarters at Brownsville. During this time, he provided aid to Mexican President Benito Juárez and prevented French troops of Emperor Maximilian from establishing themselves along the Rio Grande. As the Civil War came to an end, Herron commanded the District of Northern Louisiana.

After the Civil War, he stayed in Baton Rouge. He was tax collector for a district in New Orleans and served as a United States Marshal from 1867 until 1869. He was the Secretary of State of Louisiana before moving to New York City in 1877, where he practiced law and served as a banker. He was married to Adelaide Wilbray. A widower since 1901, he died of a six-week illness, reportedly a pauper in a tenement in New York City, and was buried in Calvary Cemetery in Queens, New York. He was a member of the Grand Army of the Republic and the Military Order of the Loyal Legion of the United States The commonly accepted story that Herron died in poverty is likely false, as the "tenement" in which he lived at the time of his death was in a fashionable neighborhood and well-appointed.

Honors
A bronze bust of Herron (sculpted by Solon Borglum) was erected in January 1914. It stands on Pemberton Avenue in Vicksburg National Military Park.

Medal of Honor citation
Rank and organization: Lieutenant Colonel, 9th Iowa Infantry. Place and date: At Pea Ridge, Ark., May 7, 1862. Entered service at: Pittsburgh, Pa. Born: February 17, 1837, Pittsburgh, Pa. Date of issue September 26, 1893.

Citation:

Was foremost in leading his men, rallying them to repeated acts of daring, until himself disabled and taken prisoner.

See also
List of Medal of Honor recipients
List of American Civil War Medal of Honor recipients: G–L
List of American Civil War generals (Union)

Notes

References

 

1837 births
1902 deaths
American Civil War prisoners of war
American Roman Catholics
United States Army Medal of Honor recipients
Burials at Calvary Cemetery (Queens)
People of Iowa in the American Civil War
People of Pennsylvania in the American Civil War
Union Army generals
United States Marshals
Secretaries of State of Louisiana
American Civil War recipients of the Medal of Honor
Military personnel from Pittsburgh